Wold Nunatak is a nunatak standing 10 nautical miles (18 km) east of Mount Manthe in the southeast part of the Hudson Mountains. Mapped by United States Geological Survey (USGS) from surveys and U.S. Navy air photos, 1960–66. Named by Advisory Committee on Antarctic Names (US-ACAN) for Richard J. Wold, United States Antarctic Research Program (USARP) geologist at Byrd Station, 1960–61 season.

Nunataks of Ellsworth Land